USS Platte (AO-186) was the fifth and last of the Cimarron-class ships built to carry cargo and bulk fuel to battle groups.  She was homeported in Norfolk, Virginia and carried a crew of 180 -230 sailors as standard during her years of service.

Platte derived her name from the Platte River.  Her contract was awarded 11 April 1978 and she was built at Avondale Shipyard in New Orleans.  Her keel was laid 2 February 1981, and launched 30 January 1982. Platte was commissioned on 16 April 1983.

Her most notable historical event was the collision with the  approximately 500 miles east of Jacksonville, Florida on 19 April 1989. This event was reported in the media, however it was overshadowed by a major naval disaster that occurred the same day.  That was the day the  turret 2 exploded killing 47 sailors off the coast of Puerto Rico.

Between May 1989 – May 1994 she transited the Panama Canal four times (three times west to east and once east to west.)

She departed Norfolk, Virginia 28 December 1990 en route to Desert Shield support.  Before she made the turn into the Straits of Hormuz, the shield became a storm and she fueled ships as the "Fifth and Finest Fleet Oiler" before becoming the "Preferred Oiler of the Persian Gulf.". She returned to Norfolk 28 June 1991 from Desert Storm.

In February 1992 she departed Norfolk, Virginia and returned to Avondale Shipyard. Between February and December Platte was "jumboized", meaning that, after cutting the ship into two sections, a 35.7 m long section was added to increase the fuel load. The new "mid-body" section included an ammunition elevator, a second Fairbanks Morse emergency diesel generator, additional a/c capabilities as well as several cargo holds. She departed Avondale Shipyard December 1992 being the last of the five ships to undergo this process and completing it in 10 months.

At commissioning she was 88 feet wide at her beam, 216 m (700 ft) long, displaced approx 37,000 tons at a speed of 19 knots.  Propulsion was two  steam boilers (automated steam) to one propeller. Her draft was 32 feet.

In 1991 she circumnavigated South America escorting the aircraft carrier  to its west coast home port after leaving the shipyards in Norfolk, Va.

She was decommissioned 30 June 1999 and placed in the James River Reserve Fleet (Ghost Fleet) near Fort Eustis, Virginia. Platte was slated for disposal at the earliest opportunity as of 7 August 2008.

She was scrapped by Southern Recycling at Brownsville in December 2014.

References

 
 Jane's Fighting Ships (1982-1999 published versions)
 USS Platte (AO-186) Deck Logs
 Virginia Pilot Archives – 28 December 1990 Front Page A1; 28 June 1991 Local Page D1
 USS Platte (AO-186) Website
 NavSource Online

Cimarron-class fleet replenishment oilers
Ships built in Bridge City, Louisiana
National Defense Reserve Fleet
1982 ships